Slávičie údolie cemetery (literally "Nightingale Valley") is a cemetery in the Karlova Ves borough in Bratislava, Slovakia.

The cemetery was built in 1912 for poorer inhabitants of Bratislava, and it was called "cemetery of the poor". In World War I soldiers were buried there. Today it is the final resting place for prominent Slovak artists, scientists, soldiers, airmen and politicians.

Notable interments

References

External links
 

1912 establishments in Slovakia
Buildings and structures in Bratislava
Cemeteries in Slovakia
Parks in Bratislava